Albert Edward Ives (18 December 1908 – 1980) was an English professional footballer who played as a full-back for Sunderland.

References

1908 births
1980 deaths
Footballers from Newcastle upon Tyne
English footballers
Association football fullbacks
Sunderland A.F.C. players
Barnsley F.C. players
Blyth Spartans A.F.C. players
English Football League players